The Women's club throw athletics event for the 2012 Summer Paralympics took place at the London Olympic Stadium on 1 September. One event was contested for 3 different classifications.

Results

F31/32/51

References

Athletics at the 2012 Summer Paralympics
2012 in women's athletics
2012
Women's sport in London